Robert Bouchard (born March 30, 1943) is a Canadian politician. Born in Saint-Émond, Quebec, Bouchard represented the riding of Chicoutimi—Le Fjord in the House of Commons of Canada from 2004 to 2011 as a member of the Bloc Québécois.

Bouchard served as the Bloc Québécois critic for National Revenue.

External links
 
 How'd They Vote?: Robert Bouchard's voting history and quotes

1943 births
Bloc Québécois MPs
French Quebecers
Living people
Members of the House of Commons of Canada from Quebec
People from Saguenay–Lac-Saint-Jean
21st-century Canadian politicians